Lingfang Township is a rural township in Chaling County, Hunan Province, People's Republic of China.

Cityscape
The township is divided into 18 villages, the following areas: Dizhou Village, Changya Village, Tangchong Village, Lingfang Village, Yuanjing Village, Songjiang Village, Xi'an Village, Hewu Village, Zikeng Village, Zhongzhou Village, Zhongzhou Village, Taoshui Village, Ciwan Village, Longzhukeng Village, Zhangyang Village, Dayue Village, Nanchong Village, Chepu Village, and Guanxi Village.

References

External links

Divisions of Chaling County